Mangabeys are West-African Old World monkeys, with species in three of the six genera of tribe Papionini. 

The more typical representatives of Cercocebus, also known as the white-eyelid mangabeys, are characterized by their bare, upper eye-lids which are lighter than their facial skin colouring, and the uniformly coloured hairs of the fur. Members of Lophocebus, the crested mangabeys, tend to have dark skin, eyelids that match their facial skin, and crests of hair on their heads.

A new species, the highland mangabey, was discovered in 2003 and was initially placed in Lophocebus. The genus Rungwecebus was later created for this species.

Lophocebus and Cercocebus were once thought to be very closely related, so much so that all the species were in one genus. However, the species within genus Lophocebus are now thought to be more closely related to the baboons in genus Papio, while the species within genus Cercocebus are more closely related to the mandrill.

Genera
The three genera of mangabeys are:
Lophocebus, the crested mangabeys
Rungwecebus, the highland mangabey (kipunji)
Cercocebus, the white-eyelid mangabeys

References

Papionini
Primates of Africa